Melis Birkan (born 15 July 1982) is a Turkish actress. 

She has starred in Çağan Irmak's films The Messenger and Alone. She also starred in the series Leyla ile Mecnun. She is married to fellow actor Aras Aydın.

Filmography

References

External links 
 

Living people
Turkish film actresses
Turkish television actresses
Actresses from Ankara
1982 births